Makumbura North Grama Niladhari Division is a Grama Niladhari Division of the Maharagama Divisional Secretariat of Colombo District of Western Province, Sri Lanka. It has Grama Niladhari Division Code 498A.

Makumbura North is a surrounded by the Homagama South, Galavilawatta North, Malapalla West, Kottawa Town, Makumbura South and Malapalla East Grama Niladhari Divisions.

Demographics

Ethnicity 
The Makumbura North Grama Niladhari Division has a Sinhalese majority (95.1%). In comparison, the Maharagama Divisional Secretariat (which contains the Makumbura North Grama Niladhari Division) has a Sinhalese majority (95.7%)

Religion 
The Makumbura North Grama Niladhari Division has a Buddhist majority (93.0%). In comparison, the Maharagama Divisional Secretariat (which contains the Makumbura North Grama Niladhari Division) has a Buddhist majority (92.0%)

References 

Grama Niladhari Divisions of Maharagama Divisional Secretariat